The Nygmiini are a tribe of tussock moths of the Erebidae family.

Description
Adult females of the tribe have an enlarged seventh abdominal segment with a tuft of scales and use this adaptation to protect their egg mass.

Genera

References

Lymantriinae
Moth tribes